James Brown Mason (January 28, 1775August 31, 1819) was an American physician and legislator who served in the Rhode Island House of Representatives from 1804 to 1814, where he was speaker from 1812 to 1814. Elected to Congress in November 1814, he represented one of Rhode Island's two at-large congressional districts from 1815 until 1819.

Early life

Mason was born on January 28, 1775, in the small rural town of Thompson in the Connecticut Colony. He was the son of John and Rose Anna (née Brown) Mason.

As a young man, James pursued classical studies and graduated from Rhode Island College (the future Brown University) in 1791. He studied medicine and was admitted to practice.

Career
Mason moved to Charleston, South Carolina, where he practiced medicine from 1795 to 1798. While in South Carolina, he met and married his first wife. Upon her death in 1798, he returned to Rhode Island.

In Providence, Mason engaged in mercantile pursuits between 1798 and 1819. He served as a trustee of Brown University from 1804 to 1819.

Political career
He served as member of the Rhode Island House of Representatives from 1804 to 1814 and served as Speaker of the House from February 1812 to May 1814.

Mason was elected as a Federalist to the Fourteenth and Fifteenth Congresses (March 4, 1815 – March 3, 1819). He was not a candidate for renomination in 1818 to the Sixteenth Congress.

Personal life

On July 16, 1800, Mason married Alice Brown (1777–1823), the youngest daughter of John Brown and Sarah (née Smith) Brown. Her father was a wealthy merchant, slave trader, and statesman from Providence, and a founder of Brown University. James and Alice's children were:

 Abby Mason (1800–1822), who married Nicholas Brown III (1792–1859) in 1820
 Zerviah Mason (1801–1802), who died in infancy
 Zerviah Mason (1803–1812), who died in childhood
 Sarah Brown Mason (1804–1864), who married first George Benjamin Ruggles (1804–1833) in 1825. After his death, she married secondly to Levi Curtis Eaton (1812–1852)
 Rosa Anna Mason (1817–1872), who married Dr. William Grosvenor (1810–1888)

Six months after leaving Congress, Mason died in Providence at the age of 44 and was interred in North Burial Ground.

References

External links

 
 

1819 deaths
Brown University alumni
1775 births
Federalist Party members of the United States House of Representatives from Rhode Island
Burials at North Burying Ground (Providence)
People of colonial Connecticut
18th-century American physicians
People from Thompson, Connecticut